The Guajira is a large coal field located in the north of Colombia in Cesar department. Guajira represents one of the largest coal reserve in Colombia having estimated reserves of 4.54 billion tonnes of coal.

See also 
List of coalfields

References 

Coal in Colombia